= Results of the 2016 Vitória Carnival =

This page are listed the results of all of the Vitória Carnival on year 2016

== Grupo Especial ==
Pos	Samba schools	Pts	Classification or relegation
1	MUG	179.7	2016 Carnival champion
2	Jucutuquara	178.3	
3	Boa Vista	178.3	
4	Piedade	177.7	
5	Pega no Samba	176.5	
6	Barreiros	147.5	2017 Grupo A

== Grupo A ==
Pos	Samba schools	Pts	Classification or relegation
1	Novo Império	176.7	2017 Grupo Especial
2	Andaraí	175.5	
3	São Torquato	174.4	
4	Tradição Serrana	174.2	
5	Chega Mais	171.4	
6	Imperatriz do Forte	171.3	
7	Chegou o Que Faltava	171.2	
8	Rosas de Ouro	167.8	
